S8 Guangzhou–Foshan–Zhaoqing Expressway, sometimes shortened to Guangwu Expressway, is a provincial expressway connecting the cities of Guangzhou, in Guangdong province, and Wuzhou, in Guangxi autonomous region. 

Expressways in China
Transport in Guangdong
Transport in Guangxi